The Holy Fire is the self-titled debut EP by American rock band The Holy Fire and was originally released in 2004.

Track listing
"Lift Off Message"
"In Signs"
"Sleeping, Screaming Boy"
"I Heard Your Song"
"Outside the Mercury"
"Lehman's Lament"

Personnel
Sean Hoen - guitar, vocals
Nathan Miller - bass
Nick Marko - drums
Dan Skiver - guitar
Mark Penxa - artwork
Jon Drew - engineer

2004 debut EPs
The Holy Fire albums